Louis VII (1120 – 18 September 1180), called the Younger, or the Young, was King of the Franks from 1137 to 1180. He was the son and successor of King Louis VI (hence the epithet "the Young") and married Duchess Eleanor of Aquitaine, one of the wealthiest and most powerful women in western Europe. The marriage temporarily extended the Capetian lands to the Pyrenees.

During his march, as part of the Second Crusade in 1147, Louis stayed at the court of King Géza II of Hungary on the way to Jerusalem. During his stay in the Holy Land disagreements with his wife led to a deterioration in their marriage. She persuaded him to stay in Antioch but Louis instead wanted to fulfil his vows of pilgrimage to Jerusalem. He was later involved in the failed siege of Damascus and eventually returned to France in 1149.

Louis' reign saw the founding of the University of Paris. He and his counsellor Abbot Suger, pushed for greater centralisation of the state and favoured the development of French Gothic architecture, notably the construction of Notre-Dame de Paris.

Louis' marriage was annulled in 1152 after no male heir was produced. Immediately after their annulment, Eleanor married Henry Plantagenet, Duke of Normandy and Count of Anjou, to whom she conveyed Aquitaine, which following Henry's ascension to the throne created an Angevin Empire. Later, Louis supported Henry's rebellious sons to foment further disunity in the Angevin realms. Louis went on to marry his second cousin, Constance of Castile, but still failed to produce a male heir. Constance died in childbirth with their second daughter. His third marriage to Adela of Champagne, five weeks after Constance's death, was finally able to gave him a son, Philip. Louis died in 1180 and was succeeded by his son Philip II.

Early life and education
Louis was born in 1120, the second son of Louis VI of France and Adelaide of Maurienne. The early education of the young Louis anticipated an ecclesiastical career. As a result, he became well learned and exceptionally devout, but his life course changed decisively after the accidental death of his older brother Philip in 1131, when Louis unexpectedly became the heir to the throne of France. In October 1131, his father had him anointed and crowned by Pope Innocent II in Reims Cathedral. He spent much of his youth in Saint-Denis, where he built a friendship with the abbot Suger, an advisor to his father who also served Louis during his early years as king.

Early reign

Following the death of Duke William X of Aquitaine, Louis VI moved quickly to have his son married to Eleanor of Aquitaine (who had inherited William's territory) on 25 July 1137. In this way, Louis VI sought to add the large, sprawling territory of the duchy of Aquitaine to his family's holdings in France. On 1 August 1137, shortly after the marriage, Louis VI died, and Louis VII became king. The pairing of the monkish Louis and the high-spirited Eleanor was doomed to failure; she reportedly once declared that she had thought to marry a king, only to find she had married a monk. There was a marked difference between the frosty, reserved culture of the northern court in the Île-de-France, where Louis had been raised, and the rich, free-wheeling court life of the Aquitaine with which Eleanor was familiar. Louis and Eleanor had two daughters, Marie and Alix.

In the first part of his reign, Louis VII was vigorous and zealous in the exercise of his prerogatives. His accession was marked by no disturbances other than uprisings by the burgesses of Orléans and Poitiers, who wished to organise communes. He soon came into violent conflict with Pope Innocent II, however, when the archbishopric of Bourges became vacant. The king supported the chancellor Cadurc as a candidate to fill the vacancy against the pope's nominee Pierre de la Chatre, swearing upon relics that so long as he lived, Pierre should never enter Bourges. The pope thus imposed an interdict upon the king.

Louis VII then became involved in a war with Theobald II of Champagne by permitting Raoul I of Vermandois, the seneschal of France, to repudiate his wife, Theobald II's sister, and to marry Petronilla of Aquitaine, sister of the queen of France. As a result, Champagne decided to side with the pope in the dispute over Bourges. The war lasted two years (1142–44) and ended with the occupation of Champagne by the royal army. Louis VII was personally involved in the assault and burning of the town of Vitry-en-Perthois. At least 1,500 people who had sought refuge in the church died in the flames. Condemned by the ecclesiastical authorities, Louis removed his armies from Champagne and returned them to Theobald. He accepted Pierre de la Chatre as archbishop of Bourges and shunned Raoul and Petronilla. Desiring to atone for his sins, he declared his intention of mounting a crusade on Christmas Day 1145 at Bourges. Bernard of Clairvaux assured its popularity by his preaching at Vezelay on Easter 1146.

In the meantime, Geoffrey V, Count of Anjou, completed his conquest of Normandy in 1144. In exchange for being recognised as Duke of Normandy by Louis, Geoffrey surrendered half of the county of Vexin—a region vital to Norman security—to Louis. Considered a clever move by Louis at the time, it would later prove yet another step towards Angevin rule.

In June 1147, in fulfillment of his vow to mount the Second Crusade, Louis VII and his queen set out from the Basilica of Saint-Denis, first stopping in Metz on the overland route to Syria. Soon they arrived in the Kingdom of Hungary, where they were welcomed by the king Géza II of Hungary, who was already waiting with King Conrad III of Germany. Due to his good relationships with Louis VII, Géza II asked the French king to be his son Stephen's baptism godfather. Relations between the kingdoms of France and Hungary remained cordial long after this time: decades later, Louis's daughter Margaret was taken as wife by Géza's son Béla III of Hungary. After receiving provisions from Géza, the armies continued the march to the East. Just beyond Laodicea at Honaz, the French army was ambushed by Turks. In the resulting battle of Mount Cadmus, the Turks first bombarded the French with arrows and heavy stones, then swarmed down from the mountains and massacred them. The historian Odo of Deuil gives this account:
During the fighting the King Louis lost his small and famous royal guard, but he remained in good heart and nimbly and courageously scaled the side of the mountain by gripping the tree roots [...] The enemy climbed after him, hoping to capture him, and the enemy in the distance continued to fire arrows at him. But God willed that his cuirass should protect him from the arrows, and to prevent himself from being captured he defended the crag with his bloody sword, cutting off many heads and hands.

Louis VII and his army finally reached the Holy Land in 1148. His queen Eleanor supported her uncle, Raymond of Poitiers, and prevailed upon Louis to help Antioch against Aleppo. But Louis VII's interest lay in Jerusalem, and so he slipped out of Antioch in secret. He united with King Conrad III of Germany and King Baldwin III of Jerusalem to lay siege to Damascus; this ended in disaster and the project was abandoned. Louis VII decided to leave the Holy Land, despite the protests of Eleanor, who still wanted to help her doomed uncle Raymond. Louis VII and the French army returned home in 1149.

A shift in the status quo
The expedition to the Holy Land came at a great cost to the royal treasury and military. It also precipitated a conflict with Eleanor that led to the annulment of their marriage. Perhaps the marriage to Eleanor might have continued if the royal couple had produced a male heir, but this had not occurred. The Council of Beaugency found an exit clause, declaring that Louis VII and Eleanor were too closely related for their marriage to be legal, thus the marriage was annulled on 21 March 1152. The pretext of kinship was the basis for annulment, but in fact, it owed more to the state of hostility between Louis and Eleanor, with a decreasing likelihood that their marriage would produce a male heir to the throne of France. On 18 May 1152, Eleanor married the Count of Anjou, the future King Henry II of England. She gave him the duchy of Aquitaine and bore him three daughters and five sons. Louis VII led an ineffective war against Henry for having married without the authorisation of his suzerain. The result was a humiliation for the enemies of Henry and Eleanor, who saw their troops routed, their lands ravaged, and their property stolen. Louis reacted by coming down with a fever and returned to the Île-de-France.

In 1154, Louis VII married Constance of Castile, daughter of King Alfonso VII of Castile. She also failed to supply him with a son and heir, bearing only two daughters, Margaret and Alys. By 1157, Henry II of England began to believe that Louis might never produce a male heir, and that the succession of France would consequently be left in question. Determined to secure a claim for his family, he sent his chancellor, Thomas Becket, to press for a marriage between Margaret and Henry's heir, Henry the Young King. Louis agreed to this proposal, and by the Treaty of Gisors (1158) betrothed the young pair, giving as a dowry the Norman city of Gisors and the surrounding county of Vexin.

Louis VII was devastated when Constance died in childbirth on 4 October 1160. As he was desperate for a son, he married Adela of Champagne just 5 weeks later. To counterbalance the advantage this would give the king of France, Henry II had the marriage of their children (Henry "the Young King" and Margaret) celebrated at once. Louis understood the danger of the growing Angevin power; however, through indecision and a lack of fiscal and military resources in comparison to Henry II, he failed to oppose Angevin hegemony effectively. One of his few successes was a trip to Toulouse in 1159 to aid Raymond V, Count of Toulouse, who had been attacked by Henry II: Louis entered into the city with a small escort, claiming to be visiting his sister, the countess. Henry declared that he could not attack the city while his liege lord was inside, and went home. In 1169, Louis was petitioned by the bishop of Le Puy to stop the Viscount of Polignac from attacking travelers through Auvergne. The viscount was besieged by Louis at Nonette and the county was turned into a prévôt.

Diplomacy

Louis' reign saw Holy Roman Emperor Frederick I press his claims to Arles, in southeastern France. When a papal schism broke out in 1159, Louis VII took the side of Pope Alexander III, the enemy of Frederick I, and after two comical failures of Frederick I to meet Louis VII at Saint-Jean-de-Losne (on 29 August and 22 September 1162), Louis VII definitely gave himself up to the cause of Alexander III, who lived at Sens from 1163 to 1165. In return for his loyal support, the pope bestowed upon Louis the Golden Rose.

More important for English history would be Louis's support for Thomas Becket, Archbishop of Canterbury, whom he tried to reconcile with Henry II. Louis sided with Becket as much to damage Henry as out of piety—yet even he grew irritated with the stubbornness of the archbishop, asking when Becket refused Henry's conciliations, "Do you wish to be more than a Saint?"

Louis also tried to weaken Henry by supporting his rebellious sons, and encouraged Plantagenet disunity by making Henry's sons, rather than Henry himself, the feudal overlords of the Angevin territories in France. But the rivalry among Henry's sons and Louis's own indecisiveness broke up the coalition (1173–1174) between them. Finally, in 1177, the pope intervened to bring the two kings to terms at Vitry-en-Perthois.

In 1165, Louis's third wife bore him a son and heir, Philip. Louis had him crowned at Reims in 1179, in the Capetian tradition (Philip would in fact be the last king so crowned). Already stricken with paralysis, Louis himself could not be present at the ceremony. He died on 18 September 1180 in Paris and was buried the next day at Barbeau Abbey, which he had founded. His remains were moved to the Basilica of Saint-Denis in 1817.

Marriages and children
Louis' children by his three marriages:

With Eleanor of Aquitaine:
 Marie (1145 – 11 March 1198), married Henry I of Champagne
 Alix (1151–1197/1198), married Theobald V of Blois

With Constance of Castile:
 Margaret (1158 – August/September 1197), married (1) Henry the Young King; (2) King Béla III of Hungary
 Alys (4 October 1160 – c. 1220), engaged to Richard I of England; she married William IV, Count of Ponthieu

With Adela of Champagne:
 Philip II Augustus (22 August 1165 – 1223)
 Agnes (1171 – after 1204), married 1) Alexius II Comnenus (1180–1183), 2) Andronicus I Comnenus (1183–1185), then 3) Theodore Branas (1204)

Fictional portrayals
Louis is a character in Jean Anouilh's 1959 play Becket. In the 1964 film adaptation he was portrayed by John Gielgud, who was nominated for the Academy Award for Best Supporting Actor. He was also portrayed by Charles Kay in the 1978 BBC TV drama series The Devil's Crown. He has a role in Sharon Kay Penman's novels When Christ and His Saints Slept and Devil's Brood. The early part of Norah Lofts' biography of Eleanor of Aquitaine deals considerably with Louis VII, seen through Eleanor's eyes and giving her side in their problematic relationship. Louis is one of the main characters in Elizabeth Chadwick's novel The Summer Queen.

References

Sources

|-

|-

1120 births
1180 deaths
12th-century kings of France
Christians of the Second Crusade
House of Capet
Dukes of Gascony
Dukes of Aquitaine
Counts of Poitiers
Burials at the Basilica of Saint-Denis